The Tiger Gang is a 1971 Kommissar X Eurospy film directed by Harald Reinl that was an international co-production between West Germany and Italy.

Cast
Tony Kendall as Jo Louis Walker
Brad Harris as Captain Tom Rowland
Gisela Hahn Jacky Clay
Mohammad Ali as Superintendent Ali
Zeba as Shirin
Ernst Fritz Fürbringer as Professor Tavaria / Frank Stefani
Rainer Basedow as Ted Woolner
 Nino Korda as Paradiso
 Nisho as Deeba Khan
 Ursula Campbell as Air Hostess
 Ali Ejaz as Waheed
 Qavi Khan as Hassan
 Khalid Saleem Mota

Soundtrack

References

External links

Tiger Gang at Variety Distribution

1971 films
1971 multilingual films
German spy action films
Italian spy action films
West German films
1970s Italian-language films
1970s German-language films
Films directed by Harald Reinl
Films shot in Pakistan
Films shot in Afghanistan
Films about the illegal drug trade
Films based on German novels
Films scored by Francesco De Masi
1970s spy thriller films
1970s buddy films
German spy thriller films
Italian spy thriller films
Pakistani multilingual films
Italian multilingual films
German multilingual films
1970s German films
1970s Italian films
Films scored by Debu Bhattacharya
Films scored by Francesco de Masi